Dzmitry Loban (born 3 May 1981) is a Belarusian male cross-country skier and biathlete. He has competed at the Winter Paralympics in 2010, 2014 and 2018 claiming 2 medals in his Paralympic career.

Career 
Dzmitry made his Paralympic debut during the 2010 Winter Paralympics and managed to claim a solitary bronze medal in the men's 10km cross-country skiing event. He  went on to represent Belarus at the 2014 Winter Paralympics and went medalless during the competition. He was also selected to compete at the 2018 Winter Paralympics, his third Paralympic event. Dzmitry clinched a silver medal in the men's 7.5km sitting biathlon event as a part of the 2018 Winter Paralympics.

Coincidentally Dzmitry's wife, Lidziya Hrafeyeva also represented Belarus at the 2018 Winter Paralympics.

Biography 
Dzmitry Loban was affected in a train accident at the age of 22 as he lost both of his legs above the knee which prompted him to take the sport of Paralympic Nordic skiing in 2007.

He married fellow Belarusian Paralympic Nordic skier, Lidziya Hrafeyeva who subsequently made her Paralympic debut during the 2018 Winter Paralympics.

References

External links 
 

1981 births
Belarusian male biathletes
Belarusian male cross-country skiers
Biathletes at the 2010 Winter Paralympics
Biathletes at the 2014 Winter Paralympics
Biathletes at the 2018 Winter Paralympics
Cross-country skiers at the 2010 Winter Paralympics
Cross-country skiers at the 2014 Winter Paralympics
Cross-country skiers at the 2018 Winter Paralympics
Paralympic cross-country skiers of Belarus
Paralympic biathletes of Belarus
Paralympic silver medalists for Belarus
Paralympic bronze medalists for Belarus
Medalists at the 2010 Winter Paralympics
Medalists at the 2018 Winter Paralympics
Living people
Paralympic medalists in cross-country skiing
Paralympic medalists in biathlon